The Target House 200 was a NASCAR Busch Series stock car race held at North Carolina Speedway as an accompanying race to the Pop Secret 400. It was last run in 2003, after which the fall weekend of racing at Rockingham was removed from both the Busch as well as Winston Cup Series schedules.

Like its Winston Cup counterpart, the Target House sponsorship carried over to its successor race at Auto Club Speedway. Although the race dates were given originally to Darlington Raceway, Rockingham's races were considered to be replaced by the Fontana races because a second race weekend was given to Fontana after the removal of Rockingham.

In the twenty runnings of this race, Mark Martin led all drivers with six wins. Harry Gant, Morgan Shepherd, and Jamie McMurray each won this race twice.

Past winners

External links
 

Former NASCAR races
NASCAR Xfinity Series races